The G7e torpedo was the standard electric torpedo used by the German Kriegsmarine submarines in World War II. It came in 20 different versions, with the initial model G7e(TII) in service at the outbreak of the war. Due to several problems, leading to the German "Torpedokrise" which lasted until the end of 1941, the improved G7e(TIII) took over as the standard electric torpedo used by German U-boats for the rest of the war. All were powered by  electric motors and lead-acid batteries which required onboard maintenance to maintain their functionality.

Other major G7e-versions that saw operational service during the war, were the first acoustic homing torpedo G7es(TIV) Falke and its improved successor G7es(TV) Zaunkönig.

G7e(TII)
The G7e(TII) went in service with German U-boat fleets in 1936. Its existence was virtually unknown to the British until fragments of one torpedo were recovered following the sinking of the Royal Oak in October 1939. The advantages of the G7e in contrast to the G7a wet-heater steam-driven torpedo rested in its simplicity and cheapness of manufacture (half the cost), as well as being virtually silent and leaving almost no visible trail of air bubbles to alert ships that they were under attack.

Poor range and speed were not the TII's only problems. Both the contact and magnetic detonators were unreliable, major flaws that also afflicted the United States Navy's standard Mark 14 anti-submarine and anti-ship torpedo. The magnetic influence exploder, designed to allow the torpedo to run under the keel of a ship and detonate, breaking the ship's back, was inconsistent and would often detonate prematurely, or not at all. This led the BdU to order that all G7e(TII) torpedoes be fired only for contact detonation. However, the contact pistol of the TII also proved to be unreliable; the British battleship HMS Nelson managed to survive almost certain destruction when three torpedoes from  struck on her keel, two broke upon hitting and the other failed to explode.

These technical defects led to the circumstance that attacks on at least one battleship, seven heavy cruisers, seven destroyers and some cargo ships were not successful.

Nevertheless, the German Navy, after much prodding by German U-boat Command (BdU), invested resources into correcting the TII's flaws. Gradually, it improved, and by the end of the Norwegian Campaign problems with the contact exploder and depth-keeping gear had been mostly solved, with significant strides made in improving the magnetic proximity feature. By that time, however, the TII was already being phased out of production.

G7e(TIII)

Improvements in the design of the G7e(TII) were incorporated into the production of the next model of electric torpedo for Germany's U-boat fleet. Introduced in 1942, the TIII represented a vast improvement over the early TII. The faulty exploders from the TII were scrapped in favor of a new design.

With the improved design the TIII complemented the G7a(TI) wet-heater torpedo, which was only used at night for the rest of the war (it remained the only torpedo used by surface ships though), and the TIII was used for day-attacks. Using the TIII's perfected proximity feature, U-boat captains could effectively fire under the keel of a ship and break the back of their targets with a single torpedo, increasing the overall effectiveness of the U-boat fleet. The TIII was also issued with program steering FaT (Flächenabsuchender Torpedo) - - G7e(TIII Fat II) - and LuT (Lagenunabhängiger Torpedo) - G7e(TIII Lut II) - pattern running systems for convoy attacks.

Though many opportunities had been missed due to the defects of the TII torpedo, with the new TIII U-boats were deadlier than ever.

G7es(TIV) Falke
The TIV Model was the adjunct of the earlier TIII model in nearly every way.

Early in 1933 Germany started development and testing of acoustic homing mechanisms for torpedoes. From the outset of submarine warfare, submariners had dreamed of being able to aim and fire torpedoes without surfacing or using a periscope. The periscope gives away the location of a submarine, and a hull-penetrating periscope greatly weakens a submarine's pressure hull and limits the depths to which it can dive.

With the introduction of Falke, U-boats could remain more deeply submerged and fire at convoys with nothing to give away their position but the noise of their screws. Rather than aiming with a periscope, the torpedo could be roughly aimed at a sound contact as detected by a U-boat's hydrophones, and the homing mechanism could be trusted to find the target without the need for precise aiming.

Falke worked much like a normal straight-running torpedo for the first  of its run, after which its acoustic sensors became active and searched for a target. The sensitive sound-sensing equipment in Falke required the torpedo be as quiet as possible, hence it ran at only ; in addition, the firing U-boat was forced to stop its motors. Falke was intended to home on merchant targets, however, so its slow speed was not a great hindrance.

It was replaced by the G7es(TV) "Zaunkönig" (referred to by the Allies as GNAT, for German Navy Acoustic Torpedo), which was faster and better able to home onto the sound of fast moving warships as well as merchant traffic.

Though its period of operational service was brief, Falke was a proof of concept for the acoustic homing torpedo. Its introduction occurred only two months before the U.S. Navy achieved its initial combat success with the Mark 24 FIDO "mine." FIDO was not a mine, but a passive, acoustic-homing torpedo designed for use by long-range patrol aircraft. The initial success with the Mark 24 occurred on 14 May 1943, when a PBY-5 from VP-84 sank  with the new weapon. Most sources indicate that the Germans' first combat success with the Zaunkönig (GNAT) did not occur until September 1943.

See also
 List of World War II torpedoes of Germany

Citations

References

Weapons and ammunition introduced in 1936
World War II torpedoes of Germany